Hieronymus Baumgartner, also von Paumgartner or Baumgärtner (9 March 1498, Nuremberg - 8 December 1565, Nuremberg) was a Bürgermeister, and a major contributor to the early Reformation.

Biography 

He was descended from the patrician family, "von Paumgartner auf Lonnerstadt", later known as "". In 1518, he became a student at the University of Wittenberg, where his fellow students included Georg Major, Joachim Camerarius and Philipp Melanchthon. He studied philosophy, mathematics, law and, under the influence of Martin Luther, Greek and Hebrew.

After graduating, he returned to Nuremberg as a follow of Luther and participated in local politics; rising rapidly. In 1525, he was elected to the city council; in 1533 he became the Bürgermeister (Mayor). He was also the city's first  (a type of financial manager for churches and schools). On a national scale, he became a "Triumvir" in 1558, which allowed him to take part in the Imperial Diet.

He also played a major role in introducing the Reformation to Heideck, Hilpoltstein and Allersberg. In 1548, he was opposed to the Augsburg Interim, an attempted compromise by Emperor Charles V, following the Schmalkaldic War.

In 1544, as he was returning from a meeting in Speyer, he was kidnapped by the Knight, in the forest near , and was held for ransom. He was held captive for over fourteen months before the ransom was paid.

He was one of the many suitors of Katharina von Bora, who would eventually marry Martin Luther. However, in 1526, he married Sybilla Dichtlin (died 1567), the daughter of Bernhard Dichtel, a pfleger (castle manager) in Starnberg; originally from Tutzing.

References

Further reading 
 
 
 
 
 Gustav Bossert: "Die Gefangenschaft des Hieronymus Baumgartner und die Nürnberger vor Haltenbergstetten". In: Württembergische Vierteljahrshefte für Landesgeschichte, Vol. 11 (1888), pps.207–217 (online).

External links 

1498 births
1565 deaths
German Protestant Reformers
University of Wittenberg alumni
Schmalkaldic League
Protestant religious leaders
People from Nuremberg